Kazys Bobelis (4 March 1923 – 30 September 2013) was a Lithuanian surgeon and politician.

Biography
Bobelis was born in Kaunas.  His father was Colonel Jurgis Bobelis (1885–1954). In 1941, Bobelis participated in the June Uprising against the Bolsheviks. Bobelis studied medicine at Vytautas Magnus University (Lithuania), University of Graz (Austria) and University of Tübingen (Germany). In 1948, he graduated maxima cum laude from Tübingen. In 1949 he moved to the United States and lived in Chicago, working as a surgeon. From 1962 to 1972, he was a professor of clinical surgery at Loyola University Chicago. From 1978 to 1991 he was a private doctor.

While in the United States, Bobelis was active in the Lithuanian immigrant community. From 1962 to 1976, he served on the board of the Lithuanian American Congress. In 1979 he became the chairman of the Supreme Committee for the Liberation of Lithuania (VLIK).

In 1992 he returned to Lithuania. From 1992 to 31 May 2006, he was a member of the Seimas for the Marijampolė constituency. In 1997, he was a candidate for president and received 3.91% of the vote.

From 1996 to 2000, he was president of the Lithuanian Baseball Association. Bobelis was a member of the Catholic youth and student organization Ateitis.

Family
He was married to Dalia. They had five children: Aldona, Alena, Rūta, Algis and Jonas. They had a sixth child, Julius (1960–1977) who died at the age of 17 from colon cancer.

Awards and honors
 1976: Riflemen's Star
 1984: Order of St. Gregory the Great
 1986: Ellis Island Medal of Honor
 1995: Swedish Royal Order
 1993: Order of the Cross of Vytis
 2004: Commander's Grand Cross of the Order of Vytautas the Great
 2004: Honorary citizen of Marijampolė

References

1923 births
2013 deaths
Lithuanian anti-communists
Lithuanian surgeons
Members of the Seimas
Politicians from Kaunas

Grand Crosses of the Order of Vytautas the Great
Knights of St. Gregory the Great
Loyola University Chicago faculty
Recipients of the Order of the Cross of Vytis
University of Graz alumni
University of Tübingen alumni
Vytautas Magnus University alumni
21st-century Lithuanian politicians
Lithuanian expatriates in the United States
Lithuanian independence activists